"Sufficient unto the day is the evil thereof" is an aphorism which appears in the Sermon on the Mount in the Gospel of Matthew chapter 6 — Matthew 6:34.

The wording comes from the King James Version and the full verse reads: "Take therefore no thought for the morrow: for the morrow shall take thought for the things of itself. Sufficient unto the day is the evil thereof."

It implies that we should not worry about the future, since each day contains an ample burden of evils and suffering.

The same words, in Hebrew, are used to express the same thought in the Rabbinic Jewish saying dyya l'tzara b'shaata (דיה לצרה בשעתה), "the suffering of the (present) hour is enough for it".

The original Koine Greek reads ἀρκετὸν τῇ ἡμέρᾳ ἡ κακία αὐτῆς (arketon tē hēmera hē kakia autes); alternative translations include:
 "Each day has enough trouble of its own." (New American Standard Bible)
 "There is no need to add to the troubles each day brings" (Today's English Version)

It is also similar to the Epicurean advice of writers such as Anacreon and Horace — quid sit futurum cras, fuge quaerere (avoid asking what the future will bring) —

However, Jesus's sermon has sometimes been interpreted to mean that God knows everyone's needs.

Sermons
Thomas Sheridan wrote a sermon upon this verse on the occasion of the death of Queen Anne. His sermon notes being dated August 1st, the date of Anne's death, he later reused it for an anniversary of the accession of King George I. Using a verse discussing the "evils" of the day on such an occasion shocked the audience; Sheridan was accused of Jacobite sympathies and lost his chaplaincy.

References

Gospel of Matthew
Greek proverbs
Matthew 6
New Testament words and phrases
Sermon on the Mount